K. A. Pandian is an Indian politician who is a Member of Legislative Assembly of Tamil Nadu. He was elected from Chidambaram as an All India Anna Dravida Munnetra Kazhagam candidate in 2016 & 2021.

Elections contested

References 

Tamil Nadu MLAs 2021–2026
Tamil Nadu MLAs 2016–2021
Living people
All India Anna Dravida Munnetra Kazhagam politicians
Year of birth missing (living people)